John Oszajca (pronounced OH-ZSA-KUH; born May 8, 1974) is an American singer-songwriter born in Hawaii.

Early life
Oszajca was born and raised in Waimanalo, Hawaii.

After relocating to Los Angeles, Oszajca became a part of the Los Angeles music scene.

Career
He was signed to Interscope Records for whom he released his debut album, From There to Here, and later to Warner Bros. Records, for whom he released First Sign of Anything. Oszajca's third album, Elephant Graveyard was released in March 2007 on Dreamy Draw Records. John's as yet untitled fourth album was expected to be released in 2018.

He also appeared in the films Dead and Breakfast, Other Peoples Parties, America Speaks Out; and the television program, ER.

Personal life
John was engaged to Lisa Marie Presley from winter 1999 to spring 2001. He became engaged to Keshama Jane in 2009, and the couple soon married. They had their first child in 2010, followed by a second in 2012. They recently bought the property in New Zealand where Oszajca's wife grew up, and continue to split their time between Los Angeles and New Zealand.

Discography
From There to Here (2000) Interscope Records
First Sign of Anything (2006) Warner Bros. Records
Elephant Graveyard (2007) Dreamy Draw Music

References
The Boston Phoenix, March 9 – 16, 2000: Hawaiian punch – Meet John Oszajca

Melodic.net Review of "First Sign Of Anything"

External links
Official site
Music Marketing Manifesto
Several videos

American male singer-songwriters
Living people
Year of birth missing (living people)
Singer-songwriters from Hawaii